Vast Broadband is a cable and internet company serving South Dakota and southwestern Minnesota, more specifically the communities of Sioux Falls, Rapid City, Spearfish, Luverne, Marshall, Watertown, Vermillion, Sturgis, Storm Lake, Yankton, Worthington, Tea and Belle Fourche among others.  Vast Broadband is privately held by Clarity Telecom.

History 
Vast Broadband was formed in 2014 after the close of a deal in which Vast acquired cable systems from WOW! in South Dakota, Minnesota and Iowa, which WOW! had picked up through its acquisition of Knology in 2012. The deal left Vast serving approximately 293,000 residential and business customers making it the 34th largest cable company in the United States.  Vast's corporate team would be largely made up of that of Clarity Telecom.

In early 2015, Vast began making major network upgrades increasing internet speeds and adding more channels to their customers this would be the beginning of Vast trying to differentiate itself from WOW!'s products and services.

Vast Broadband was purchased by GI Partners from Pamlico Capital and Oak Hill Capital for an undisclosed amount in 2020. Vast completed its rebrand to Bluepeak in June 2022. In 2022, Bluepeak expanded into Casper, Wyoming and is expected to launch in Cheyenne, Wyoming.

Internet availability by state

References 

American companies established in 2014
Companies based in Gwinnett County, Georgia
Cable television companies of the United States
Economy of South Dakota